Ali Rabei (born 6 December 1955), also known by his nickname, Ebad, is an Iranian politician and former intelligence officer. He served as the Minister of Labor from 2013 to 2018. He was an adviser to the former President Mohammad Khatami from 1997 to 2005. On 4 August 2013, he was nominated as Minister of Labor to the incumbent cabinet by Hassan Rouhani. He is also a professor at the Payame Noor University.

Early life and education
Ali Rabei was born on 6 December 1955 in Javadieh, Tehran. He graduated from the University of Tehran with a degree in state management in the 1970s and became a technician at the General Motors factory in Tehran. He was arrested by SAVAK in a labor strike in Ekbatan.

Political career
Following the Iranian Revolution, Rabei became a member of the Islamic Republican Party and its labor branch head. Then, he was appointed by then Prime Minister Mehdi Bazargan as a member of labor law codification, a membership he held until the present. He is one of the closest people to Mohammad Khatami. After Khatami's election, Rabei was one of his advisors for social affairs. He was also Khatami's representative at the Ministry of Intelligence in 2001. He was also the head of the Presidential Secretariat and executive committee and Homeland Security Committee Propaganda of Supreme National Security Council under Hassan Rouhani from 2002 to 2005. After the election of Rouhani as president, he was nominated for the Minister of Labor. He was confirmed by the parliament on 15 August 2013.

Works
“Sociological changes in value in Iran”, 1993
“Sociology, political corruption in the third world countries”, 1996
“National Security Studies”, 1997
“The crux of the civil administration”, 1998
“Knowledge management in organizations”, 2001
“Knowledge management processes and procedures”, 2008
“Risk and Crisis Management”, 2013

References

1955 births
Living people
Iranian sociologists
People from Tehran
Deputies of the Ministry of Intelligence (Iran)
Government ministers of Iran
Islamic Labour Party politicians
Worker House members
Presidential advisers of Iran
Islamic Republican Party politicians
Islamic Revolutionary Guard Corps officers
Impeached Iranian officials
Academic staff of Payame Noor University